Cubillos del Sil is a village and municipality located in the region of El Bierzo (province of León, Castile and León, Spain) . It is located near to Ponferrada, the capital of the region El Bierzo. Cubillos del Sil has about 1,771 inhabitants.

Its economy was traditionally based on agriculture, wine and coal mining. Nowadays, most of the inhabitants work on the surrounding area on activities such as electricity generation manufacturing in ENDESA (Compostilla II Power Station).

Cubillos del Sil also a large reservoir in its vicinity, the Barcena reservoir, to which many tourists visit during the summer.

References

External links 
Council of Cubillos del Sil (Spanish)
 Cubillos del Sil at Google Maps
Endesa

Municipalities in El Bierzo
Populated places in the Province of León